Tapachultec was a Mixe language spoken in Chiapas, Mexico.  It is now extinct.  Spoken in the area around modern-day Tapachula, Chiapas it is part of the Mixe–Zoquean language family.

Little is known about the language. However according to Otto Shuman, a researcher of linguistics at the National Autonomous University of Mexico, the language was lost in the 1930s, during the reign of Chiapan Governor Victorico Grajales.  Grajales banned the use of indigenous languages in order to attempt to create a stronger bond between Chiapas and the rest of Mexico.

A Mixean language is recorded as having been spoken in the El Salvador-Guatemala border area, in between Pipil populations; this may have been the same language as Tapachultec or related.

References

 
 
 
 

Mixe–Zoque languages
Mesoamerican languages
Extinct languages of North America
Languages extinct in the 1930s
Chiapas